Russell, also known as , is a town in the Bay of Islands, in New Zealand's far north. It was the first permanent European settlement and seaport in New Zealand.

History and culture

Māori settlement 
Before the arrival of the Europeans, Russell was inhabited by Māori because of its salubrious climate and the abundance of food, fish and fertile soil. Russell was then known as Kororāreka, and was a small settlement on the coast. This name translates to 'sweet kororā' ( meaning blue penguin and  meaning sweet), after an ailing chief who had eaten a penguin broth remarked ka reka te kororā or 'the kororā is sweet'. Early European explorers James Cook and Marc-Joseph Marion du Fresne remarked that the area was quite prosperous.

European settlement 
When European and American ships began visiting New Zealand in the early 1800s, the indigenous Māori quickly recognised there were great advantages in trading with these strangers, whom they called .
The Bay of Islands offered a safe anchorage and had a large Māori population. To attract ships, Māori began to supply food, timber, and prostitution. What the Māori population wanted was respect, firearms, alcohol, and other goods of European manufacture.

Kororāreka developed as a result of this trade but soon earned a very bad reputation as a community without laws and full of prostitution. It became known as the "Hell Hole of the Pacific"; European law had no influence and Māori law was seldom enforced within the town's area. Fighting on the beach at Kororāreka in March 1830, between northern and southern hapū within the Ngāpuhi iwi, became known as the Girls' War.

On 30 January 1840 at the Christ Church, Governor William Hobson read his proclamations (which were the beginnings of the Treaty of Waitangi) in the presence of a number of settlers and the Māori chief Moka Te Kainga-mataa. A document confirming what had happened was signed at this time by around forty witnesses, including Moka, the only Māori signatory. The following week, the treaty proceedings would then move across to the western side of the bay to Waitangi.

By this time, Kororāreka was an important mercantile centre and served as a vital resupply port for whaling and sealing operations. When the Colony of New Zealand was founded in that year, Hobson was reluctant to choose Kororāreka as his capital, due to its bad reputation. Instead he purchased land at Okiato, situated five kilometres to the south, and renamed it Russell in honour of the Secretary of State for the Colonies, Lord John Russell. Captain Hobson soon decided that the move to the Okiato site was a mistake, and Auckland was selected as the new capital not long after.

Kororāreka was part of the Port of Russell, and after Russell (Okiato) became virtually deserted, Kororāreka gradually came to be known as Russell as well. In January 1844, Governor Robert FitzRoy officially designated Kororāreka as part of the township of Russell. Today, the name Russell applies only to Kororāreka, while the former capital is known either by its original name of Okiato or as Old Russell.

Catholic mission

In 1841–42, Jean Baptiste Pompallier established a Roman Catholic mission in Russell, which contained a printing press for the production of Māori-language religious texts. His building, known as Pompallier Mission, remains in the care of Heritage New Zealand.

On 18 November 1844, while at anchor in the Bay of Islands, Mary Davis Wallis describes Kororarika  as a town "which appears small, consisting of a few houses along the shore, and cottages scattered here and there on the slope of the hills behind. Nothing is to be seen back of the town but lofty hills not particularly verdant."

Flagstaff dispute

At the beginning of the Flagstaff War in 1845 (touched off by the repeated felling and re-erection of the symbol of British sovereignty on Flagstaff Hill above the town), the town was sacked by Hōne Heke, after diversionary raids drew away the British defenders. The flagstaff was felled for the fourth time at the commencement of the Battle of Kororāreka, and the inhabitants fled aboard British ships, which then shelled and destroyed most of the houses.

Hōne Heke directed his warriors not to interfere with Christ Church and the Pompallier Mission.

Marae

The local Kororāreka Marae is a traditional meeting ground of Te Kapotai, a hapū of Ngāpuhi.

Demographics

Russell had a population of 762 at the 2018 New Zealand census, an increase of 60 people (8.5%) since the 2013 census, and a decrease of 24 people (−3.1%) since the 2006 census. There were 339 households, comprising 372 males and 390 females, giving a sex ratio of 0.95 males per female. The median age was 58.8 years (compared with 37.4 years nationally), with 69 people (9.1%) aged under 15 years, 66 (8.7%) aged 15 to 29, 351 (46.1%) aged 30 to 64, and 276 (36.2%) aged 65 or older.

Ethnicities were 86.6% European/Pākehā, 20.1% Māori, 1.2% Pacific peoples, 2.0% Asian, and 1.6% other ethnicities. People may identify with more than one ethnicity.

The percentage of people born overseas was 33.9, compared with 27.1% nationally.

Although some people chose not to answer the census's question about religious affiliation, 54.3% had no religion, 31.5% were Christian, 1.6% had Māori religious beliefs, 0.8% were Hindu, 0.4% were Buddhist and 0.8% had other religions.

Of those at least 15 years old, 153 (22.1%) people had a bachelor's or higher degree, and 102 (14.7%) people had no formal qualifications. The median income was $27,100, compared with $31,800 nationally. 87 people (12.6%) earned over $70,000 compared to 17.2% nationally. The employment status of those at least 15 was that 261 (37.7%) people were employed full-time, 114 (16.5%) were part-time, and 24 (3.5%) were unemployed.

Much of the accommodation in the area consists of holiday homes or tourist accommodation.

Economy

Russell is now mostly a "bastion of cafés, gift shops and B&Bs". Pompallier Mission, the historic printery/tannery/storehouse of the early Roman Catholic missionaries, Is the oldest surviving industrial building in New Zealand, while the town's Christ Church is the country's oldest surviving Anglican church. The surrounding area also contains many expensive holiday homes, as well as New Zealand's most expensive rental accommodation, the Eagles Nest. The photographer Laurence Aberhart lives here.

A car ferry across the Bay of Islands runs between Okiato and Opua, and is the main tourist access to Russell. There is a land connection, but this requires a substantial detour (the ferry route is only 2.3 kilometres, while the land route is 43.5 km).

Education

Notable people
 

Lucy Takiora Lord (1842–1893), guide and interpreter

See also
 Pompallier Mission

References

External links

Russell (a local page about the town)
Russell Info (tourism information from bayofislands.net)

Populated places in the Northland Region
Far North District
History of the Northland Region